Patrick Zircher is an American comic book artist and penciller.

Career
Zircher's early career as an illustrator began with production of several completed works for Villains and Vigilantes, Champions and other pen-and-paper role-playing games, as well as work for independent comic book publishers.  He illustrated a number of projects for Caliber Comics including Dragon Star II, Jason and the Argonauts (under the Tome Press banner), and his own creator owned series, Samurai 7 (released under Caliber's Gauntlet imprint).

Following this he went on to work largely for Marvel Comics on titles including Iron Man, Thunderbolts and New Warriors. He also did a considerable amount of work for DC, primarily on Nightwing and on Shadowman for Valiant Comics.

Bibliography

DC Comics
Action Comics #957–958, 963–964, 969–970, 973–974, 979–980, 984 (2016–2017)
Birds of Prey #13 (along with Greg Land) (2000)
Darkstars #8-9 (1993)
Detective Comics #784-786 (2003)
The Flash vol. 4 #23.1, 27-28 (2013-2014)
Green Arrow vol. 4 # 41–46, 48 (2015)
Hal Jordan and the Green Lantern Corps #30-31 (2017)
Justice League Quarterly #10 (1993)
Nightwing vol. 2 #42-44, 47, 77, 86–91, 93 (2002–04)
Nightwing vol. 4 #53 (2018)
The Silencer #8-10 (2018)
Suicide Squad vol. 3 #20-22, 24-26 (2013-2014)
Superman #584 (2000)
Titans #13 (2000)
Trinity vol. 2 #17-18, 21-22 (2017-2018)
Young Justice #22 (2000)
The New 52: Futures End #1, 6, 9, 13, 17, 22, 25, 29, 34, 40, 44 (2014)

Marvel Comics
Avengers, vol 3, #55 (2002)
Black Panther, vol. 2, #59-60 (2003)
Cable & Deadpool #3-24, 50 (2004–06)
Captain America, vol. 3, #23 (1999)
Captain Marvel, vol. 2, #14, 35 (2001–02)
Civil War: The Initiative (Iron Man) (2007)
Dr. Strange, Sorcerer Supreme #83 (1995)
Hulk, vol. 3, #36, 42-46 (2011)
Iron Man, vol 3, #6, 12, 16, 20 (1998–99)
Iron Man, vol. 4, #7-14 (2006–07)
Iron Man/Captain America '98, one shot (1998)
Iron Man: The Iron Age, miniseries, #1-2 (1998)
Ms. Marvel, vol. 2, #12 (along with Roberto de la Torre) (2007)
 Mystery Men, 5-issue limited series with David Liss (August–November 2011, tpb: hardcover , soft cover )
New Warriors #55-75 (1995–96)
Secret Avengers #21.1 (2012)
Star Trek: Early Voyages #1-8, 13-15 (1997–98)
Star Trek: Telepathy War (1997)
Terror Inc., miniseries, #1-5 (2007–08)
Thor: Ages of Thunder (along with Khari Evans) (2008)
Thor: Man of War (along with Clay Mann) (2009)
Thor: Reign of Blood (along with Khari Evans) (2008)
Thunderbolts #45, 49, 51–58, 60–65, 67 (2000–02)
Venom: Along Came a Spider, miniseries, #1-3 (1996)
Web of Spider-Man Super-Special (Black Cat) #1 (1995)
X-Men 2: The Movie (2003)

Other publishers
Green Hornet #16-17, 19, 22–24, 26–28, 31, 34-37 (NOW Comics, 1992–94)
Vampirella Monthly #13-14 (Harris, 1999)
Shadowman #1-6 (2012-2013)

References

External links

Living people
American comics writers
American comics artists
Marvel Comics people
Marvel Comics writers
DC Comics people
Role-playing game artists
Year of birth missing (living people)